Tim Slade (born 3 August 1985) is an Australian racing driver who competes in the Repco Supercars Championship. Slade currently drives the No. 3 Ford Mustang GT for Blanchard Racing Team.

Early career
Slade first appeared at a national level racing in the 2003 Australian Formula Ford Championship. During the 2004 Australian Formula 3 Championship, Slade, in his rookie season with Team BRM, won his first race when making a one-off appearance at the penultimate round of the series. Slade returned to Formula 3 for the following season, beginning a long-running partnership with businessman James Rosenberg, who owned the car. However, after having scored just 25 points after the first four races, compared to the 57 points of joint series leaders Chris Alajajian and Michael Trimble, Slade was dropped from the team.

Taking a step backwards, Slade competed in his first full season at national level in 2006, racing for Sonic Motor Racing Services in the 2006 Australian Formula Ford Championship. Slade narrowly lost a season-long battle with John Martin for the title.

Supercars Championship

Development Series
Turning his back on open wheelers, Slade moved into the Fujitsu V8 Supercar Series for the 2007 season, starting the season with ANT Racing in a Ford Falcon (BA). However, Slade's season was blighted by a team shift to MW Motorsport mid-season and he finished ninth in the points. The highlight of his season was a second-place finish in the reverse grid race at Queensland Raceway.

In 2008 Slade renewed his partnership with Rosenberg, who purchased Slade a Holden Commodore (VZ) from Perkins Engineering, which ran under the banner of 'Slade Sport'. Early in the season Slade won the Wakefield Park round, but poor results at Queensland Raceway and at Mount Panorama, plus the limited resources available, restricted Slade to seventh in the series results.

Paul Morris Motorsport
Early in 2009, Slade was announced as the replacement driver for the retiring Paul Morris at his eponymous team to graduate into V8 Supercars. The drive was once again backed by Rosenberg. Driving a Holden Commodore (VE) sponsored by Supercheap Auto, Slade finished 23rd in the championship.

James Rosenberg Racing

In 2010, Slade moved teams to the newly formed James Rosenberg Racing, driving the #47 Wilson Security-backed Ford Falcon (FG) as a satellite entry of Stone Brothers Racing. His best results of the year were a pair of fifth places at Hidden Valley Raceway and at the Phillip Island 500, with co-driver Jack Perkins. For 2011, Slade remained with the team, with a new title sponsor, Lucky 7, and improved to ninth in the championship standings including three podium positions at Queensland Raceway.

He had his breakout year in 2012 aboard the Lucky 7 Falcon, where he finished fifth in the championship. Stone Brothers Racing was then sold at the end of 2012 to Erebus Motorsport, who brought in the Mercedes-Benz E63 AMG to V8 Supercars under the new Car of the Future regulations in 2013. However, the Erebus package struggled and Slade could only manage 22nd in the championship.

Walkinshaw Racing

Slade moved to Walkinshaw Racing for the 2014, driving his team's #47 VF Commodore. This also marked a return to Supercheap Auto colours for Slade and a move away from his association with James Rosenberg, who coincidentally ended up running a sister car to Slade at Walkinshaw Racing for Nick Percat. He finished the year in 17th position. He remained with the team for the 2015 season, finishing 13th in the championship.

Brad Jones Racing

In 2016, Walkinshaw Racing downsized to two cars and Slade moved to Brad Jones Racing. After a slow start to the season, Slade won the first two races of his career at the 2016 Woodstock Winton SuperSprint.

DJR Team Penske
After he announced he will retire from full-time competition he was signed by DJR Team Penske to co-drive alongside Scott McLaughlin for the Bathurst 1000.
The pair finished 5th behind other DJR Car of Fabian Coulthard and Tony D'Alberto

Blanchard Racing Team

In 2021 Tim Blanchard signed Slade to drive the No. 3 CoolDrive Auto Parts backed ex-23Red Racing Ford Mustang GT for his team Blanchard Racing Team. 
(Formally known as Tim Blanchard Racing).

PremiAir Racing

After two years with the Blanchard Racing Team, Tim Slade announced his shift to PremiAir Racing for the 2023 season.

GT
In 2012, Slade joined Erebus Motorsport for its Bathurst 12 Hour campaign, driving the team's Mercedes-Benz SLS AMG GT3. Along with Jeroen Bleekemolen, Peter Hackett and Bret Curtis, he finished the race in second position. He once again entered the race with Erebus in 2013, finishing in sixth position with Lee Holdsworth and Peter Hackett. In 2016, he competed in the event once again, this time in a McLaren 650S GT3 with Tony Walls, Matt Campbell and Warren Luff. Slade has also appeared as a guest driver at the annual Pro-Am event of the Australian Carrera Cup Championship on multiple occasions.

Career results

Complete Bathurst 1000 results

‡Walsh was entered as a co-driver to Slade but withdrew due to injury and was replaced with Heimgartner.

Bathurst 6 Hour

Supercars Championship results
(key) (Races in bold indicate pole position) (Races in italics indicate fastest lap)

References

External links
 Tim Slade - Official Profile – Supercars.com
 
 

1985 births
Australian Formula 3 Championship drivers
Australian sprint car drivers
Formula Ford drivers
Living people
People from the North Shore, Sydney
Racing drivers from Sydney
Supercars Championship drivers
V8SuperTourer drivers
Dick Johnson Racing drivers
Team Penske drivers
Stone Brothers Racing drivers
McLaren Racing drivers